Hirut Meshesha (born 20 January 2001) is an Ethiopian middle-distance runner. She won the bronze medal in the women's 1500 metres at the 2022 World Indoor Championships in Belgrade. Meshesha took gold for the 800 metres at the 2019 African Games.

Career
Hirut Meshesha gained her first international experience at the 2017 IAAF World U18 Championships held in Nairobi, Kenya, where she won the bronze medal in the girls' 800 metres. She then went to Argentina for 2018 Summer Youth Olympics in Buenos Aires and took bronze in the girls' 800m event 

In April 2019, she competed at the African U18 and U20 Championships, which were held in Abidjan, Ivory Coast, and won the silver medal at 800m in the under-20 women category. A month later, she won the women's 800 metres at the Ethiopian Athletics Championships. In August, Meshesha represented Ethiopia at the 2019 African Games held in Rabat, Morocco and won the gold medal in the 800m event.

She earned the bronze medal for the women's 1500 metres at the 2022 World Indoor Championships held in Belgrade, Serbia. Her compatriot Gudaf Tsegay led and Ethiopian medals sweep as Axumawit Embaye came second.

Competition record

Circuit wins, and National championships
 Diamond League
 2022 (3) (1500 m): Rabat Meeting International Mohammed VI d'Athlétisme, Rome Golden Gala, Chorzów Kamila Skolimowska Memorial
 Ethiopian Championships
 800 metres: 2019

Personal bests
 1500 metres – 3:57.30 (2022)
 1500 metres indoor – 4:02.14 (2022)

References

External links
 

2001 births
Living people
Ethiopian female middle-distance runners
Athletes (track and field) at the 2019 African Games
African Games gold medalists for Ethiopia
African Games medalists in athletics (track and field)
Athletes (track and field) at the 2018 Summer Youth Olympics
Athletes (track and field) at the 2018 African Youth Games
African Games gold medalists in athletics (track and field)
Ethiopian Athletics Championships winners
World Athletics Indoor Championships medalists
21st-century Ethiopian women